Carlo Gancia may refer to:

Carlo Gancia (wine), founder of the Gancia wine-producing company
Carlo Vallarino Gancia, former co-owner of the Forti Formula One team